Kindu is a city in the Democratic Republic of Congo, the capital of Maniema province. It has a population of about 200,000 and is situated on the Lualaba River at an altitude of about 500 metres, and is about 400 km west of Bukavu.

Kindu is linked by rail to the mining areas of Kalemie, Kamina and Kananga to the south. It also has an airport with a 2,200 metre runway and has historically been an important port along the Congo River system.

History

The town was an important centre for the ivory, gold and the slave trade during the nineteenth century. Arab-Swahili slave traders were based here from about 1860 and sent caravans overland to Zanzibar.

Henry Morton Stanley came upon "this remarkable town" on 5 Dec. 1876, describing it as "remarkably long" with a "broad street, thirty feet wide, and two miles in length" and "behind the village were the banana and the palm groves."

In November 1961, during the Congo Crisis, the Kindu atrocity took place in Kindu. During the rule of Mobutu Sese Seko Kindu was also the capital of the former Maniema subregion of Kivu region.

Geography
Kindu is located 2°57′S, 25°55′E at an elevation of approximately 1500 ft (450 m) above sea level.

Demographics
The city's population is estimated at between 140,000 and 200,000 residents. As with the rest of Congo, the vast majority adhere to Christianity. Just under half of the population is Catholic. Slightly under 10% of the population are Anglican and there is also a small Muslim community in the city.

Economy

The main economic activity in Maniema Province is mining. Diamonds, copper, gold and cobalt are mined outside of Kindu.  There is also a market in Kindu as well as shops throughout the town.

Government and Politics
Kindu is the provincial capital and is home to the provincial assembly and ministries.

Transportation

Kindu is served by Kindu Airport. Most of the goods coming to town come from Goma, Bukavu and Kinshasa by air.

It is also served by the Congo Railway which connects it to Lubumbashi among other destinations.

There is also a port in Kindu which is located on the western bank of the Lualaba River.

Kindu lies along National Road 31 (N31) as well as Primary Regional Road 508 (R508).

Roads in Maniema Province are unsurfaced and in a generally poor condition.

Education
The town has primary and secondary education facilities. The University of Kindu is also located in the city.

Notable residents

 Lovy Ongala
 Steve Wembi

Climate 
Kindu has a tropical savanna climate (Köppen Aw) bordering upon a tropical monsoon climate (Am) with a short dry season in June and July.

See also
Kindu atrocity
University of Kindu

References

External links
 
 Repairs to railway

 
Populated places in Maniema